Georgia Ann "Tiny" Thompson Broadwick (April 8, 1893 in Oxford, North Carolina – 1978 in California), or Georgia Broadwick, previously known as Georgia Jacobs, and later known as Georgia Brown, was an American pioneering parachutist and the inventor of the ripcord. She was the first woman to jump from an airplane, and the first person to jump from a seaplane.

Biography
Born to parents George and Emma Ross on April 8, 1893, Georgia Ann Thompson weighed only 3 pounds. At age 12, Tiny Broadwick had married and, at 13, had a daughter, Verla Jacobs (later, Poythress) (1906–1985). Tiny Broadwick was an abandoned mother working in a cotton mill, aged 15, when she saw Charles Broadwick's World Famous Aeronauts parachute from a hot air balloon and decided to join the travelling troupe, leaving her daughter in the care of her parents. She later became Broadwick's adopted daughter, to ease travel arrangements, though she has also been referenced as his wife (with her own family later unclear on the relationship). Although she would eventually make her jumps from airplanes, in her early career she jumped from balloons.

Billed as "the doll girl," Tiny Broadwick began performing aerial skydives and stunts while wearing a "life preserver," or parachute, designed by her adopted father, making her first jump out of a hot air balloon on December 28, 1908. The skydiving family traveled around and performed at fairs, carnivals, and parks. The appeal of the Broadwick flying troupe, according to Tiny Broadwick, was that "it was a very neat and fast act."

Among her many other achievements, she was the first woman to parachute from an airplane, which she is sometimes credited with accomplishing over Los Angeles on June 21, 1913, with aviator Glenn L. Martin as the pilot.  However, she previously made at least two jumps from Martin's plane during an exhibition in Chicago's Grant Park the week of September 16, 1912. These early jumps included a well-publicized jump on January 9, 1914, from a plane built and piloted by Martin, 1,000 feet over Griffith Park in Los Angeles.

In 1914, she demonstrated parachutes to the U.S. Army, which at the time had a small, hazardous fleet of aircraft. The Army, reluctant at first to adopt the parachute, watched as Tiny Broadwick dropped from the sky. On her fourth demonstration jump, the static line became entangled in the tail assembly of the aircraft, so for her next jump she cut the static line short and did not attach it to the plane. Instead, she deployed her chute manually by pulling the shortened, unattached line while in free-fall in what may have been the first planned free-fall jump from an airplane. This demonstrated that pilots could safely escape aircraft by using what was later called a ripcord.

Also in 1914, Broadwick jumped into Lake Michigan, becoming the first woman to parachute into a body of water.

In 1912, Tiny Broadwick married Andrew Olsen, divorced, then, in 1916, married Harry Brown, and stopped parachuting for four years. That marriage also ended in divorce; she retained the name Georgia Brown thereafter. She also severed relations with Charles Broadwick, and considered Broadwick to be her stage name. She returned to jumping again in 1920 for two more years, retiring from jumping in 1922 due to problems with her ankles. She was then said to have made over 1,100 jumps. Although she was not a pilot, she was one of the few female members of the Early Birds of Aviation.

Tiny Broadwick appeared on You Bet Your Life episode 55–07 on November 10, 1955, on To Tell the Truth on March 30, 1964 and on Mysteries at the Museum season 11, episode 33.

In 1964, Tiny Broadwick donated a parachute, handmade by Charles Broadwick of 110 yards of silk, to the Smithsonian Air Museum, the precursor to the Smithsonian Air and Space Museum.

Broadwick died in 1978 and was buried in Sunset Gardens in Henderson, North Carolina.

Legacy
In February 2006, Vance County, North Carolina, commissioners decided to name a portion of the Henderson Outer Loop highway after her. Additionally, Broadwick Street in Rancho Dominguez, California, is named for her.

References

Further reading

External links

 North Carolina Historical Marker
 ParachuteHistory.com
 Photos of Tiny Broadwick from the North Carolina State Archives

1893 births
1978 deaths
American skydivers
American stunt performers
Members of the Early Birds of Aviation
People from Oxford, North Carolina
American women aviators
Aviators from North Carolina